Felix Fielding (24 February 1858 – 4 February 1910) was an English cricketer. Fielding was a right-handed batsman who fielded as a wicket-keeper. He was born at Lewisham, Kent, and was educated at Malvern College.

Fielding made his first-class debut for Surrey against Oxford University in 1889 at The Oval. He made a further first-class appearance for the county in that season, against Middlesex at The Oval. He also appeared in a first-class match for the South against the North in 1889 at Old Trafford, as well as appearing in the repeat fixture in 1890 at Lord's. In four first-class matches, Fielding scored 100 runs at an average of 20.00, with a high score of 75. This score came for Surrey on debut.

He died at Surbiton, Surrey, on 4 February 1910.

References

External links
Felix Fielding at ESPNcricinfo
Felix Fielding at CricketArchive

1858 births
1910 deaths
People from Lewisham
People educated at Malvern College
English cricketers
Surrey cricketers
North v South cricketers
Wicket-keepers